Brout may refer to:

 Robert Brout (1928–2011), Belgian physicist
 Broût, a former commune in central France
 Brout (album), an album by Empalot